Chao Luang Phuttawong, better known as Suriwong, or Chao Luang Phaendin Yen was the 4th Ruler of Chiang Mai, reigning 1826–1846 (Thai calendar 2369-2389).

His predecessor was Khamfan and successor Mahotaraprathet.

Introduction
He was born as the first son of Prince Reun, younger brother of Prince Keaw.  His birth date is unknown. He served as a regent during Khamfan's reign and gain a lot of support from Khamfan.

His Reign
He was promoted by Rama III after Khamfan died in 1825.  During the early year of his reign, he sent troops to fight with Leng Town, Saton city, Tuan city, and Pu city to protect Lanna from Burma.  From these battles, he gained more people, weapon, and livestock to Chiangmai.  However during most of his reign, Burma was having war with Britain so they do not bother Lanna and he ruled people with kindness.  So, many people called him Lord of Peaceful land.

He died in June 1846.

References

See also
 List of the Kings of Lanna

1870 deaths
Rulers of Chiang Mai
Year of birth missing
Chet Ton dynasty
19th-century Thai monarchs